Charles Hoskinson is an American entrepreneur who is a co-founder of the blockchain engineering company Input Output Global, Inc. (formerly IOHK), and the Cardano blockchain platform, and was a co-founder of the Ethereum blockchain platform.

Early life and education
Hoskinson attended Metropolitan State University of Denver and the University of Colorado Boulder "to study analytic number theory before moving into cryptography through industry exposure".

Hoskinson has claimed that he had entered a PhD program but had dropped out. However, Denver did not have a graduate  program in mathematics. Colorado Boulder verified that he had attended as a half-time undergraduate math major, but did not earn a degree. He also claimed repeatedly to have worked for the Defense Advanced Research Projects Agency (DARPA), though DARPA confirmed he had not.

Career
In 2013, Hoskinson quit a consulting job to begin a project called the Bitcoin Education Project. According to Hoskinson, the limited supply makes Bitcoin like a digital form of gold.

He joined the Ethereum team as one of five original founders with Vitalik Buterin in late 2013 and held the position of chief executive. Buterin and the Ethereum team removed Hoskinson in 2014 after a dispute over whether the project should be commercial (Hoskinson's view) or a nonprofit (Buterin's view).

In late 2014, Hoskinson and former Ethereum colleague Jeremy Wood formed IOHK (Input Output Hong Kong), an engineering and research company, to build cryptocurrencies and blockchains. IOHK's key project is Cardano, a public blockchain and smart contract platform that hosts the ADA cryptocurrency. Hoskinson did not pursue venture capital for Cardano, saying that it ran counter to the blockchain's principles. Hoskinson has also said that venture capital involvement might lead to an outsized control of a project.

In 2017, IOHK sponsored research labs focusing on blockchain technology at the University of Edinburgh and the Tokyo Institute of Technology. This resulted in the Ouroboros blockchain consensus protocol. In 2020, IOHK donated $500,000 for the University of Wyoming to create a blockchain laboratory.

Forbes estimated Hoskinson's wealth as $500m–$600m in 2018.

In 2020, Hoskinson spoke at the World Economic Forum in Davos, where he said that blockchain may eventually cause social change. In 2022, he appeared as a witness before the commodity exchanges, energy, and credit sub-committee of the U.S. House of Representatives Committee on Agriculture.

Philanthropy
In September 2021, Hoskinson donated $20 million to Carnegie Mellon University to build the Hoskinson Center for Formal Mathematics.

Personal life 
As of 2022, Hoskinson purchased a ranch near Wheatland, Wyoming, donated equipment to the Platte County Sheriff's Office, and purchased a restaurant in Wheatland.

References

External links
 IOHK Page

Place of birth missing (living people)
1987 births
People associated with Ethereum
American chief executives
American company founders
Living people
People associated with Cardano
People associated with cryptocurrency